Ísak Snær Þorvaldsson (born 1 May 2001) is an Icelandic professional footballer who plays for Eliteserien club Rosenborg as a midfielder.

Club career
Ísak started his career with local club Afturelding in Mosfellsbær before transferring to Norwich City in July 2017. He went on loan to Fleetwood Town at the end of January 2020.

On 20 July 2020, he signed for Scottish St. Mirren on a one-year loan. On 27 August 2020 his loan with St. Mirren was terminated early. Later that day he moved on loan to Icelandic club ÍA where he appeared in 7 matches. He was again loaned to ÍA for the 2021 season where he scored 3 goals in 20 Úrvalsdeild karla matches. He helped ÍA win its last three matches of the season and stave off relegation. He also helped the club to the Icelandic Cup final where they lost to Víkingur.

He left Norwich in January 2022 and signed a three-year contract with Breiðablik in the rebranded Besta-deild karla. He started the 2022 season strongly, scoring six goals in his first four matches, the best start since Guðmundur Benediktsson scored seven goals in the first four matches in 1996.

In October 2022, he signed for Rosenborg starting from 2023.

International career
Ísak has represented Iceland at under-16, under-17, under-18 and under-19 youth levels.

On 8 June 2022, Ísak was substituted on the 54th minute of Iceland's U-21 3–1 victory against Belarus and transferred to a hospital after suffering from chest pains during the match.

Career statistics

References

External links

2001 births
Living people
Isak Thorvaldsson
Norwich City F.C. players
Fleetwood Town F.C. players
St Mirren F.C. players
Isak Thorvaldsson
English Football League players
Scottish Professional Football League players
Association football midfielders
Isak Thorvaldsson
Isak Thorvaldsson
Isak Thorvaldsson
Expatriate footballers in England
Isak Thorvaldsson
Expatriate footballers in Scotland
Iceland under-21 international footballers
Breiðablik UBK players
Iceland international footballers
Rosenborg BK players
Isak Thorvaldsson
Expatriate footballers in Norway